Kaapro Moilanen (7 October 1878, in Pieksämäki – 13 May 1957) was a Finnish schoolteacher, journalist and politician. He served as a Member of the Parliament of Finland from 1927 to 1945, representing the National Coalition Party.

References

1878 births
1957 deaths
People from Pieksämäki
People from Mikkeli Province (Grand Duchy of Finland)
National Coalition Party politicians
Members of the Parliament of Finland (1927–29)
Members of the Parliament of Finland (1929–30)
Members of the Parliament of Finland (1930–33)
Members of the Parliament of Finland (1933–36)
Members of the Parliament of Finland (1936–39)
Members of the Parliament of Finland (1939–45)
Finnish people of World War II